is a former Japanese football player. She played for Japan national team.

Club career
Kawamura was born in Fukuoka Prefecture on December 19, 1988. She joined the L.League Division 2 club Fukuoka J. Anclas in 2006. She played 77 games and scored 90 goals in Division 2 until 2009. In April 2013, she moved to JEF United Chiba. She retired at the end of the 2015 season.

National team career
In November 2008, Kawamura was selected for the Japan U-20 national team for the 2008 U-20 World Cup. In March 2013, she was selected by the Japan national team for the 2013 Algarve Cup. At this competition, she debuted against Norway on March 6. She played two games for Japan in 2013.

National team statistics

References

External links

1988 births
Living people
Nakamura Gakuen University alumni
Association football people from Fukuoka Prefecture
Japanese women's footballers
Japan women's international footballers
Nadeshiko League players
Fukuoka J. Anclas players
JEF United Chiba Ladies players
Women's association football midfielders